The Ahr Cycleway is a cycle path, that runs from the source of the River Ahr in Blankenheim, in the Eifel region of Germany, along the river to its mouth on the Rhine near Kripp. Several sections are on an old railway trackbed. The route starts in the middle of the Eifel mountains and runs initially through a valley landscape with broad river bends. From the hamlet of Schuld the Ahr Valley narrows and swings around the settlement in a loop. In Altenahr, hillsides and rocks come close to the river itself and offer the best conditions for the wine growing. Behind the spa town of Bad Neuenahr-Ahrweiler the Ahr reaches its broad delta on the Rhine. The cycleway is not difficult and suitable for leisure cyclists. The route is uniformly signed with the cycleway's logo.

Literature 
 Dirk Holterman, Harald Herzog: Der Ahr-Radweg. Radeln zwischen Rhein und Eifel. Bouvier, 2003, 
 Radwanderkarte Ahrtal-Radweg, 1 : 50 000, Publicpress-Verlag, 
 ADFC-Regionalkarte Eifel / Mosel, 1:75.000. Bielefelder Verlag, 1st edition, 2006. 
 Radatlas Radatlas "Südeifel" - zwischen Ardennen und Vulkaneifel, 1:75.000. Verlag Esterbauer.

External links 
 Ahr Cycleway at radreise-wiki.de
 Ahr Cycleway at achim-bartoschek.de
 www.ahrweg.de Home page
 Route description (pdf; 2.2 MB)

Cycleways in Germany
Eifel
Ahr